Paula Jean Davis Carter (May 17, 1940 – November 5, 2001) was an American Democrat politician who served in the Missouri House of Representatives.  She was also elected to the Missouri Senate as the first African-American woman to represent the Fifth Senatorial District from the city of St. Louis.

Born in St. Louis, Missouri, she previously worked as a chief of staff in the circuit clerk's office and as a precinct captain for J. B. "Jet" Banks.

References

1940 births
2001 deaths
20th-century American politicians
21st-century American politicians
Democratic Party members of the Missouri House of Representatives
20th-century American women politicians
21st-century American women politicians
Politicians from St. Louis
African-American women in politics
African-American state legislators in Missouri
Women state legislators in Missouri